is a railway station on the Echigo Line in Nishi-ku, Niigata, Niigata Prefecture, Japan, operated by East Japan Railway Company (JR East).

Lines

Station layout
The station consists of two ground-level opposed side platforms, with an elevated station situated above the tracks.

The station has a "Midori no Madoguchi" staffed ticket office. Suica farecard can be used at this station.

Platforms

History
The station opened on 25 August 1912. With the privatization of JNR on 1 April 1987, the station came under the control of JR East.

Passenger statistics
In fiscal 2017, the station was used by an average of 2655 passengers daily (boarding passengers only).

Surrounding area

 Niigata University
 Uchino Elementary School
Uchino Middle School

See also
 List of railway stations in Japan

References

External links

 JR East station information 

Railway stations in Niigata (city)
Echigo Line
Stations of East Japan Railway Company
Railway stations in Japan opened in 1912